Germany competed at the 1904 Summer Olympics in St. Louis, United States.

Medalists

Results by event

Athletics

Diving

The United States and Germany were the two nations that competed in diving.  The three German divers took silver, (tied) bronze, and 5th place in the platform event.

Fencing

Gymnastics

Swimming

Tennis

Germany was the only nation other than the host to have a tennis player compete.  Hugo Hardy had byes in the first two rounds of the singles tournament before meeting, and losing to, the eventual champion Beals Wright in the round of 16 (Hardy's first actual match).  Hardy had little better luck in the draw of the doubles competition, facing in the first round a pair which had combined for the silver and a bronze medal in the singles and which would go on to win the silver in the doubles.

References
Official Olympic Reports
International Olympic Committee results database

Nations at the 1904 Summer Olympics
1904
Olympics